Said bin Ahmad (died 1803) was briefly the Imam and Sultan of Oman, the second of the Al Said dynasty, ruling the country between 1783 and 1786.

Rule
Said bin Ahmad was the son of the Imam and Sultan Ahmad bin Said al-Busaidi, and was elected Imam on his father's death in 1783. The succession was unchallenged, and Said took possession of the capital, Rustaq.

His brothers Saif and Sultan bin Ahmad called on Sheikh Sakar of the Shemal tribal group to help them gain the throne. 

Sheikh Sakar took the towns of Hamra, Shargah, Rams and Khor Fakan. Said fought back, but was unable to regain these towns. 

However, Saif and Sultan felt it was too dangerous for them to stay in Oman. Saif sailed for East Africa, intending to set himself up as a ruler there. He died there soon after. Sultan escaped to Gwadar on the Makran coast of Balochistan.

Deposition
The Imam was increasingly unpopular. Around the end of 1785 a group of notables elected his brother, Qais bin Ahmad, Imam. This revolt soon collapsed.

Later one of Said‘s sons was held prisoner in Fort Al Jalali for a period by the governor of Muscat. Another son, Hamad bin Said, came to negotiate with the governor. 
Hamad and his followers managed to gain control of forts al-Jalali and al-Mirani, and thus of Muscat.

This happened in 1786. One by one the other fortresses in Oman submitted to Hamad, until Said no longer had any temporal power.

Hamad took the title of Sheikh and established his court in Muscat. Said bin Ahmad remained in Rustaq and retained the title of Imam, but this was purely a symbolic religious title that carried no power.

References
Citations

Sources

1803 deaths
18th-century Arabs
18th-century Omani people
19th-century Arabs
19th-century Omani people
Al Said dynasty
Omani imams
Sons of Omani sultans
Sultans of Oman
Year of birth missing